2NE1 were a South Korean girl group signed to YG Entertainment, with members CL, Bom, Dara, and Minzy making up the quartet. Their discography consists of two studio albums, two extended plays, eighteen singles and two promotional singles. The group established themselves in the Korean music scene in March 2009, with the release of the LG Cyon promotional single "Lollipop", a collaboration with label mates Big Bang. It brought the group instant recognition in South Korea and would receive over 3,000,000 downloads in the country.

"Fire" served as 2NE1's official debut single and was released to digital outlets on May 6, 2009. It served as the first single for their debut extended play 2NE1 1st Mini Album, which was released on July 8, 2009. The EP was named the best-selling record by a female group on the Korean Hanteo chart during 2009 and would sell over 220,000 copies by 2016. "I Don't Care" served as the lead single during this period, which reached number one on domestic charts and was one of the top downloaded songs of the year. After 2NE1 1st Mini Album, the group released a series of their own solo singles: "Kiss", "You and I", and the duet track "Please Don't Go".

In February 2010, the group released their second promotional single in support for their Samsung Corby CF, "Try to Follow Me". 2NE1 released their first full-length studio album To Anyone on September 9, 2010, where it became the number-one album of the month and would sell over 167,000 copies. It was anchored by the "triple" singles "Clap Your Hands", "Go Away" and "Can't Nobody", with promotions for "It Hurts (Slow)" beginning afterwards in October. The members' solo singles from the previous year were also included on the album.

"Don't Stop the Music" was 2NE1's first official international release because it was meant as a "special gift for Thai fans". On July 28, 2011, the group  released their second extended play 2NE1 2nd Mini Album, which spawned several hits such like "Lonely", "I Am the Best" and "Ugly"; all three songs reached number one on Gaon and garnered over 3,000,000 downloads in South Korea. Following the release of their Japanese compilation album Collection in March 2012, the group returned to Korean music charts with the chart-topping release of their single "I Love You" that July.

2NE1's sophomore Korean studio album, Crush, was released on February 27, 2014. Within four days, the album sold over 5,000 copies in the United States and charted at number 61 on the Billboard 200 in its first week of release. In doing so, the album broke two records: the best-selling K-pop album and the highest-charting K-pop album on the Billboard 200, which would hold the latter record for two and a half years until BTS's Wings. The album yielded the singles "Come Back Home" and "Gotta Be You", with the former single becoming the group's ninth number-one single on the Gaon Digital Chart, continuing the record for most number-one songs among idol groups at the time.

Following a two-year hiatus of group activities, YG Entertainment announced that 2NE1 would be disbanding in November 2016. As a farewell gift to their fans, 2NE1 released their final single "Goodbye" on January 21, 2017, featuring only the three remaining members CL, Bom, and Dara since Minzy left YG Entertainment in April 2016. In total, the group has reportedly sold 66.5 million digital and physical records worldwide, making them one of the best-selling girl groups of all time.

Albums

Studio albums

Live albums

Compilation albums

Extended plays

Singles

Promotional singles

Other charted songs

Guest appearances

Video releases

Music videos

Footnotes

References

External links
 
 

Discography
Discographies of South Korean artists
K-pop music group discographies